AOSP or AoSP may refer to:

 Android Open Source Project, part of the Android operating system ecosystem
 Area of Special Protection, under the UK Wildlife and Countryside Act 1981
 Athabasca Oil Sands Project, heavy oil development in northern Alberta, Canada